This is a list of members of the European Parliament for the Croatia in the 2014 to 2019 session, ordered by name.

See 2014 European Parliament election in Croatia for further information on these elections in Croatia.

List 
This table can be sorted by party or party group: click the symbol at the top of the appropriate column.

Former

Notes

References

2014
List
Croatia